Eduard Isken (15 April 1918 – 7 January 1997) was a Luftwaffe ace and recipient of the Knight's Cross of the Iron Cross during World War II. During his career Eduard Isken was credited with 56 aerial victories.

Career
Isken was born on 15 April 1918 in Hagendingen, at the time in the district of Metz in the Bezirk Lothringen (German Lorraine) of the German Empire. Today Hagendingen is Hagondange in north-eastern France. Isken was posted to the III. Gruppe (3rd group) of Jagdgeschwader 77 (JG 77—77th Fighter Wing) in mid-1940 where he was assigned to the 7. Staffel (7th squadron). The Staffel had been newly formed on 9 August 1940 and was placed under the command of Oberleutnant Wolfdieter Huy. On 7 September, III. Gruppe moved to an airfield at Neuruppin. Initially, the Gruppe was equipped with both Messerschmitt Bf 109 E aircraft as well as captured French Curtiss P-36 Hawk fighters. The Gruppe flew the P-36 until 29 October.

On 6 November 1941, Isken's Bf 109 F-4 was hit in oil cooler by anti-aircraft artillery resulting in a forced landing near Belobek. On 15 January 1942, he made an emergency landing in his Bf 109 F-4 (Werknummer 7138—factory number) at Grammatikowo located near Sovietskyi and was injured in the process.

Mediterranean Theater
On 23 October 1942, the British Eighth Army launched the Second Battle of El Alamein. Preceding this attack, the Luftwaffe had already planned to replace Jagdgeschwader 27 (JG 27—27th Fighter Wing), which had been fighting in North African theater, with JG 77. In preparation for this rotation, III. Gruppe of JG 77 was moved to Munich on 19 October where it was equipped with the Bf 109 G-2/trop. On 23 and 24 October, the Gruppe moved to Bari in southern Italy. The Gruppe then relocated to Tobruk Airfield on 26 October. The following day, the Gruppe moved to an airfield at Tanyet-Harun.

On 11 December, the United States Army Air Forces (USAAF) 66th Fighter Squadron attacked an Axis forces encampment and intercepted by Luftwaffe Bf 109 fighters and Italian Macchi fighters. In the afternoon, III. Gruppe engaged in combat with Curtiss P-40 Kittyhawk fighters from the Royal Air Force (RAF)  No. 112 Squadron. That day, the RAF and USAAF lost or had damaged four P-40 fighters, one of which may have been credited to Isken.

On 12 August 1944, the USAAF XII Tactical Air Command, supported by elements of the RAF, attacked German radar installations in the area of the French Riviera. Defending against this attack, Isken and Obergefreiter Horst Rippert may have shot down the Supermarine Spitfire fighter MJ442 from the No. 232 Squadron piloted by Lieutenat Geoffrey W. Dibb.

On 14 January 1945, Isken was presented the Knight's Cross of the Iron Cross at the airfield in Nellingen.

Summary of career

Aerial victory claims
According to US historian David T. Zabecki, Isken was credited with 56 aerial victories. Obermaier also lists him with 56 aerial victories, 16 on the Eastern Front and 40 on Western Front, including 17 four-engined heavy bombers, claimed in 946 combat missions. Mathews and Foreman, authors of Luftwaffe Aces — Biographies and Victory Claims, researched the German Federal Archives and found documentation for more than 44 aerial victory claims, plus two further unconfirmed claims. This number includes more than 19 on the Western Front, including two four-engined heavy bombers, and 25 on the Eastern Front.

Victory claims were logged to a map-reference (PQ = Planquadrat), for example "PQ 9876". These sectors were then subdivided into 36 smaller units to give a location area 3 × 4 km in size.

Awards
 Honour Goblet of the Luftwaffe on 26 July 1943 as Oberfeldwebel and pilot
 German Cross in Gold on 28 April 1943 as Oberfeldwebel in the 8./Jagdgeschwader 77
 Knight's Cross of the Iron Cross on 14 January 1945 as Oberfeldwebel and pilot in the 13./Jagdgeschwader 53

Notes

References

Citations

Bibliography

External links
TracesOfWar.com

1918 births
1997 deaths
People from Alsace-Lorraine
People from Moselle (department)
Luftwaffe pilots
German World War II flying aces
Recipients of the Gold German Cross
Recipients of the Knight's Cross of the Iron Cross